Thomas William Stamford (20 December 1882 – 30 May 1949) was a British politician. He was Labour Member of Parliament (MP) for Leeds West from 1923 to 1931, and from 1945 to his suicide in 1949.

References

External links 
 

1882 births
1949 deaths
Independent Labour Party National Administrative Committee members
UK MPs 1923–1924
UK MPs 1924–1929
UK MPs 1929–1931
UK MPs 1945–1950
Labour Party (UK) MPs for English constituencies
British politicians who committed suicide